Barnburgh is a village and civil parish in the City of Doncaster in South Yorkshire, England. The village is adjacent to the village of Harlington - the parish contains both villages, and according to the 2001 census it had a population of 1,979, reducing to 1,924 at the 2011 Census.

In the centre of the village is the parish church of St Peter, which is famous for the legend of the 'Cat and Man' and is mainly of Norman and Transitional architectural styles.

There was a coal mine situated half a mile west of the village called Barnburgh Main Colliery, which operated between 1911 and 1989.

See also
Listed buildings in Barnburgh

References

External links

 Barnburgh and Harlington
 Rotherham Web
 Primary school
 St Peter's church

Villages in Doncaster
Civil parishes in South Yorkshire